The Treaty of Paris, signed in Paris by representatives of King George III of Great Britain and representatives of the United States on September 3, 1783, officially ended the American Revolutionary War and overall state of conflict between the two countries. The treaty set the boundaries between British North America, later called Canada and the United States, on lines the British labeled as "exceedingly generous". Details included fishing rights and restoration of property and prisoners of war.

This treaty and the separate peace treaties between Great Britain and the nations that supported the American cause, including France, Spain, and the Dutch Republic, are known collectively as the Peace of Paris. Only Article 1 of the treaty, which acknowledges the United States' existence as free, sovereign, and independent states, remains in force.

Agreement

Peace negotiations began in Paris in April 1782 and continued through the summer. Representing the United States were Benjamin Franklin, John Jay, Henry Laurens, and John Adams. Representing Great Britain were David Hartley and Richard Oswald. The treaty was drafted on November 30, 1782, and signed at the Hôtel d'York (at present 56 Rue Jacob) in Paris on September 3, 1783, by Adams, Franklin, Jay, and Hartley.

Regarding the American treaty, the key episodes came in September 1782, when French Foreign Minister Vergennes proposed a solution, which was strongly opposed by his ally, the United States. France was exhausted by the war, and everyone wanted peace except for Spain, which insisted on continuing the war until it could capture Gibraltar from the British. Vergennes came up with a deal that Spain would accept, instead of Gibraltar. The United States would gain its independence, but it would be confined to the area east of the Appalachian Mountains. Britain would keep the area north of the Ohio River, which was part of the Province of Quebec. In the area south of that would be set up an independent Indian barrier state, under Spanish control.

The American delegation perceived that they could get a better deal directly from London. John Jay promptly told the British that he was willing to negotiate directly with them and thus to bypass France and Spain. British Prime Minister Lord Shelburne agreed. In charge of the British negotiations (some of which took place in his study at Lansdowne House, now a bar in the Lansdowne Club), Shelburne now saw a chance to split the United States from France and to make the new country a valuable economic partner. The terms were that the United States would gain all of the area east of the Mississippi River, north of Florida, and south of Canada. The northern boundary would be almost the same as they are today.

The United States would gain fishing rights off Nova Scotian coasts and agreed to allow British merchants and Loyalists to try to recover their property. The treaty was highly favorable for the United States and deliberately so from the British point of view. Shelburne foresaw highly profitable two-way trade between Britain and the rapidly-growing United States, which indeed came to pass.

Great Britain also signed separate agreements with France and Spain, and (provisionally) with the Netherlands. In the treaty with Spain, the territories of East and West Florida were ceded to Spain (without a clear northern boundary, which resulted in a territorial dispute resolved by the Treaty of Madrid in 1795). Spain also received the island of Menorca, but the Bahama Islands, Grenada, and Montserrat, which had been captured by the French and Spanish, were returned to Britain. The treaty with France was mostly about exchanges of captured territory (France's only net gains were the island of Tobago, and Senegal in Africa), but it also reinforced earlier treaties, guaranteeing fishing rights off Newfoundland. Dutch possessions in the East Indies, captured in 1781, were returned by Britain to the Netherlands in exchange for trading privileges in the Dutch East Indies by a treaty, which was not finalized until 1784.

The United States Congress of the Confederation ratified the Treaty of Paris on January 14, 1784, in Annapolis, Maryland, in the Old Senate Chamber of the Maryland State House, which made Annapolis the first peacetime capital of the new United States. Copies were sent back to Europe for ratification by the other parties involved, the first reaching France in March 1784. British ratification occurred on April 9, 1784, and the ratified versions were exchanged in Paris on May 12, 1784.

Terms

The treaty and the separate peace treaties between Great Britain and the nations that supported the American cause (France, Spain, and the Dutch Republic) are known collectively as the Peace of Paris. Only Article 1 of the treaty, which acknowledges the United States' existence as free sovereign and independent states, remains in force. The US borders changed in later years, which is a major reason for specific articles of the treaty to be superseded.

Preamble. Declares the treaty to be "in the Name of the Most Holy and Undivided Trinity" (followed by a reference to the Divine Providence) states the bona fides of the signatories, and declares the intention of both parties to "forget all past misunderstandings and differences" and "secure to both perpetual peace and harmony."
Britain acknowledges the United States (New Hampshire, Massachusetts Bay, Rhode Island and Providence Plantations, Connecticut, New York, New Jersey, Pennsylvania, Delaware, Maryland, Virginia, North Carolina, South Carolina, and Georgia) to be free, sovereign, and independent states, and that the British Crown and all heirs and successors relinquish claims to the Government, property, and territorial rights of the same, and every part thereof,
Establishing the boundaries of the United States, including but not limited to those between the United States and British North America from the Mississippi River to the Southern colonies. Britain surrenders their previously owned land,
Granting fishing rights to United States fishermen in the Grand Banks, off the coast of Newfoundland and in the Gulf of Saint Lawrence;
Recognizing the lawful contracted debts to be paid to creditors on either side;
The Congress of the Confederation will "earnestly recommend" to state legislatures to recognize the rightful owners of all confiscated lands and "provide for the restitution of all estates, rights, and properties, which have been confiscated belonging to British subjects" (Loyalists);
The United States will prevent future confiscations of the property of Loyalists;
Prisoners-of-war on both sides are to be released. All British property now in the United States is to remain with them and to be forfeited;
Both Great Britain and the United States are to be given perpetual access to the Mississippi River;
Territories captured by either side subsequent to the treaty will be returned without compensation;
Ratification of the treaty is to occur within six months from its signing.
Eschatocol. "Done at Paris, this third day of September in the year of our Lord, one thousand seven hundred and eighty-three."

Consequences

Historians have often commented that the treaty was very generous to the United States in terms of greatly enlarged boundaries. Historians such as  Alvord, Harlow, and Ritcheson have emphasized that British generosity was based on a statesmanlike vision of close economic ties between Britain and the United States. The concession of the vast trans-Appalachian region was designed to facilitate the growth of the American population and to create lucrative markets for British merchants without any military or administrative costs to Britain. The point was that the United States would become a major trading partner. As French Foreign Minister Vergennes later put it, "The English buy peace rather than make it." Vermont was included within the boundaries because the state of New York insisted that Vermont was a part of New York although Vermont was then under a government that considered Vermont not to be a part of the United States.

Privileges that the Americans had received from Britain automatically when they had colonial status (including protection from pirates in the Mediterranean Sea; see: the First Barbary War and the Second Barbary War) were withdrawn. Individual states ignored federal recommendations, under Article 5, to restore confiscated Loyalist property, and also ignored Article 6  (such as by confiscating Loyalist property for "unpaid debts"). Some, notably Virginia, also defied Article 4 and maintained laws against payment of debts to British creditors. Several Loyalists attempted to file for a return for their property in the US legal system after the war but mostly unsuccessfully.

The actual geography of North America turned out not to match the details used in the treaty. The treaty specified a southern boundary for the United States, but the separate Anglo-Spanish agreement did not specify a northern boundary for Florida. The Spanish government assumed that the boundary was the same as in the 1763 agreement by which it had first given its territory in Florida to Great Britain. While the West Florida Controversy continued, Spain used its new control of Florida to block American access to the Mississippi, in defiance of Article 8. The treaty stated that the boundary of the United States extended from the "most northwesternmost point" of the Lake of the Woods (now partly in Minnesota, partly in Manitoba, and partly in Ontario) directly westward until it reached the Mississippi River. However the Mississippi does not in fact extend that far northward, and the line going west from the Lake of the Woods never intersects the river. Additionally, the Treaty of Paris did not explain how the new border would function in terms of controlling the movement of people and trade between British North America and the United States. The American diplomats' expectation of negotiating a commercial treaty with Great Britain to resolve some of the unfinished business of the Treaty of Paris failed to materialize in 1784. The United States would thus wait until 1794 to negotiate its first commercial agreement with the British Empire, the Jay Treaty.

Great Britain violated the treaty stipulation that it should relinquish control of forts in United States territory "with all convenient speed." British troops remained stationed at six forts in the Great Lakes region and at two at the north end of Lake Champlain. The British also built an additional fort in present-day Ohio in 1794, during the Northwest Indian War. They found the justification for their actions during the unstable and extremely tense situation that existed in the area following the war, in the failure of the US government to fulfill commitments made to compensate loyalists for British losses, as well as in the British need for time to liquidate various assets in the region. All of the posts were relinquished peacefully through diplomatic means as a result of the Jay Treaty:

Notes

See also
 Ratification Day (United States)
 List of United States treaties
 Confederation Period, the era of United States history in the 1780s after the American Revolution and prior to the ratification of the U.S. Constitution
 History of the United States (1776–1789)
 Diplomacy in the American Revolutionary War
 Transcript of the Treaty of Paris

References

Further reading

 Specialized essays by scholars

 Morris, Richard G, The Peacemakers; The great powers and American independence (1965) online, a standard scholarly history

Primary sources
 Franklin, Benjamin. The Papers of Benjamin Franklin: January 21 Through May 15, 1783 (Vol. 39. Yale University Press, 2009)

External links

Treaty of Paris, 1783; International Treaties and Related Records, 1778–1974; General Records of the United States Government, Record Group 11; National Archives.
Approval of the American victory in England Unique arch inscription commemorates "Liberty in N America Triumphant MDCCLXXXIII"
The Paris Peace Treaty of September 30, 1783 text provided by Yale Law School's Avalon Project
Provisional Treaty signed November 30, 1782, text provided by Yale Law School's Avalon Project

1783 in Great Britain
1783 in the United States
1784 in the United States
Paris
Paris, Treaty of (1783)
Diplomacy during the American Revolutionary War
1783 in France
Boundary treaties
Canada–United States border
Paris, Treaty of (1783)
Paris
Paris
18th century in Paris
Paris
Benjamin Franklin
John Jay
John Adams